Zarju (also Romanized as Zarjū‘; also known as Zarjūh and Zarkhū‘) is a village in Aqda Rural District, Aqda District, Ardakan County, Yazd Province, Iran. At the 2006 census, its population was 69, in 23 families.

References 

Populated places in Ardakan County